Guy Sharabi is a former Israeli footballer who represented the Israel national football team and is one of the biggest icons of Bnei Yehuda Tel Aviv there he was part of the team that won the historic 1989-90 Israeli championship.

Honours
Israeli Championships
Winner (1): 1989-90
Runner-up (2): 1986–87, 1991–92
Toto Cup
Winner (1): 1991-92

References

1969 births
Living people
Israeli Jews
Israeli footballers
Israel international footballers
Bnei Yehuda Tel Aviv F.C. players
Hapoel Tel Aviv F.C. players
Maccabi Ironi Ashdod F.C. players
Maccabi Netanya F.C. players
Hapoel Ashkelon F.C. players
Hapoel Jerusalem F.C. players
Israeli people of Yemeni-Jewish descent
Israeli Premier League players
Footballers from Tel Aviv
Association football defenders